Heterocerus fenestratus is a species of variegated mud-loving beetle in the family Heteroceridae.

References

Further reading

External links

 

Byrrhoidea
Beetles described in 1784